The Juang language is a Munda language of the Austroasiatic language family spoken primarily by the Juang people of Odisha state, eastern India.

Classification
The Juang language belongs to the Munda language family, the whole of which is classified as a branch of the greater Austroasiatic language family. Among the Munda languages, Juang is considered to be most closely related to Kharia, although Anderson considers Juang and Kharia to have split off from each other relatively early.

Juang can be roughly divided into the Hill and Plains varieties, both of which are spoken in Odisha (Patnaik 2008:508).
Hill Juang: Gonasika Hills (in Keonjhar district) and Pallara Hills
Plains Juang: about 147 villages in southern Keonjhar district and eastern Dhenkanal district

Distribution
Juang is spoken by about 30,875 people according to the 2001 Indian census, 65% of ethnic population In Odisha state, it is spoken in southern Keonjhar district, northern Angul district, and eastern Dhenkanal district (Patnaik 2008:508).

Juang is currently an Endangered language and is considered to vulnerable, or (not spoken by children outside of home).

Juang currently has roughly under 20,000 speakers remaining

Grammar 
In Juang a number of roots are clearly exempt from the Transitive verb/Intransitive verb opposition, so that the function of the root can be determined only from its co-occurrence with the particular set of tense markers.

For Example,

pag-  Set I 'to break' -Set II 'to be broken1

rag- Set I 'to tear' - Set II 'to be torn1

guj- Set I 'to wash' - Set II 'to be was

Writing System 
The  writing system used by people who speak the Juang language is Odia.

References

Sources
 Mahapatra, B. P.. “Comparative Notes on Juang and Kharia Finite Verbs”. Oceanic Linguistics Special Publications 13 (1976): 801–814.
 Patnaik, Manideepa. 2008. "Juang". In Anderson, Gregory D.S (ed). The Munda languages, 508–556. Routledge Language Family Series 3.New York: Routledge. .

External links 
 http://www.endangeredlanguages.com/lang/4341/samples/10020
 http://www.endangeredlanguages.com/lang/4341

Languages of India
Munda languages
Endangered languages of India